The Meeting of Waters is the confluence between the dark (blackwater) Rio Negro and the pale sandy-colored (whitewater) Amazon River, referred to as the Solimões River in Brazil upriver of this confluence. For  the two rivers' waters run side by side without much mixing. It is one of the main tourist attractions of Manaus, Brazil.

This phenomenon is due to the differences in temperature, speed, and amount of dissolved sediments in the waters of the two rivers. The light-colored water is rich with sediment from the Andes Mountains, whereas the black water, running from the Colombian hills and interior jungles, is nearly sediment-free and colored by decayed leaf and plant matter.

Smaller-scale meeting of waters of the Amazon river also occurs in the locations of Santarém (Brazil) and Iquitos (Peru).

References

Rivers of Amazonas (Brazilian state)